Belle Vernon is an unincorporated community in Wyandot County, in the U.S. state of Ohio.

History
Settlement was made at Belle Vernon in 1842. A post office was established at Belle Vernon in 1842, and remained in operation until 1902.

References

Unincorporated communities in Wyandot County, Ohio
Unincorporated communities in Ohio
1842 establishments in Ohio